Lake Piso, also known as Lake Pisu and Fisherman's Lake, is an oblong tidal lagoon in Grand Cape Mount County in western Liberia, near the town of Robertsport. Its name originates from a local term meaning "pigeon's hole" – a reference to the flocks of pigeons that once came to Lake Piso for water.

Hydrology and geology
The brackish water lake borders the Cape Mount peninsula, and is connected to the Atlantic Ocean by a narrow inlet known locally as the "bar mouth". Various rivers empty into Lake Piso, including Mole Creek and Mafa River, which discharges at the 'bar mouth'. There are a number of islands in the lake, including Massatin Island, which offered a haven for monkeys and birds species, it also served as temporary refuge for some Liberians during the Liberian Civil War.

History
During World War II, Lake Piso functioned as a military base for Allied seaplanes.

Lake Piso overflowed its banks at least twice in 1998, causing heavy flooding in Garwular District. Flooding in August 1998 occurred due to a blockage of the narrow inlet connecting the lake to the Atlantic Ocean, damaging some homes.
Additional flooding in September and October, brought about by heavy rains, affected over twenty settlements, causing at least ten deaths, leaving thousands homeless, and forcing others to leave their homes.
The floods led the government of Liberia to declare the area a "disaster zone".

On December 13–14, 2002, the Papa Friends 2000 capsized in Lake Piso, at the confluence of the lake and Mafa River. The overcrowded wooden ferry was transporting approximately 200 passengers, most returning from the funeral of a local footballer. Only 15 people were rescued; the rest drowned and were recovered or presumed dead.

Human activity
The area near the lagoon is the homeland of the Vai people.

Human activity in Lake Piso includes fishing and water sports such as swimming, canoeing and water skiing. Prior to the outbreak of the First Liberian Civil War, the lagoon was a popular travel destination for tourists.

High-quality diamonds have been mined from the rivers that discharge into Lake Piso where "igneous intrusions provide potentially rich structural traps".

Notes

References
 
 
 
 
 
 
 
 

Grand Cape Mount County
Lagoons of Africa
Bodies of water of Liberia
Tourist attractions in Liberia
Ramsar sites in Liberia